Waipapa Power Station is a hydroelectric power station on the Waikato River, in the North Island of New Zealand. It is the sixth hydroelectric power station on the Waikato River. It is the smallest power station on the Waikato River.

Waipapa is operated by the publicly listed company Mercury Energy, an electricity generation and retail company.

History
Although this site was initially considered in 1943, the decision to proceed with hydro development was not made until 1953. Construction began in 1955 and the first electricity was generated in April 1961. In 2001, the turbines were refurbished to improve operational efficiency.

References

Further reading

External links

Energy infrastructure completed in 1961
Hydroelectric power stations in New Zealand
Buildings and structures in Waikato
1960s architecture in New Zealand
Brutalist architecture in New Zealand